Al Edwards may refer to:

Al Edwards (American football) (born 1967), American football wide receiver
Al Edwards (politician) (1937–2020), American politician

See also
Alan Edwards (disambiguation)
Allan Edwards (disambiguation)
Allen Edwards (disambiguation)
Albert Edwards (disambiguation)
Alexander Edwards (disambiguation)